The Ximim-Ximim River is a river of Amapá state in Brazil. It is a tributary of the Jari River which is part of the Amazon River basin.

References

Rivers of Amapá